Steve Hambley (born August 30, 1954) is the former Representative for the 69th district of the Ohio House of Representatives.  Hambley formerly served as a Medina County Commissioner for 18 years prior to seeking election to the Ohio House of Representatives, as well as a Brunswick City Councilman. He is a graduate of the University of Akron. When William G. Batchelder, the Speaker of the House who had served in the House for 38 years retired in 2014, Hambley was elected to replace him with 69% of the vote.

References

External links
Official campaign site

Republican Party members of the Ohio House of Representatives
People from Brunswick, Ohio
1954 births
Living people
University of Akron alumni
21st-century American politicians
Ohio city council members